Nong Muang Khai is a district (amphoe) in the central part of Phrae province, northern Thailand.

History
The minor district (king amphoe) Nong Muang Khai was established on 1 April 1990 from tambons Mae Kham Mi and Nong Muang Khai of Rong Kwang district and  Wang Luang and Nam Rat of Song district. It was made a subordinate of Rong Kwang District. It was upgraded to a full district on 7 September 1995.

Geography
Neighboring districts are (from the north clockwise): Song, Rong Kwang, Mueang Phrae, and Long.

Administration
The district is divided into six sub-districts (tambons), which are further subdivided into 34 villages (mubans). Nong Muang Khai is a township (thesaban tambon) and covers most parts of tambon Nong Muang Khai. There are a further five tambon administrative organizations (TAO).

References

External links
amphoe.com
Nong Muang Khai information at Phrae Province website

Nong Muang Khai